Joseph Williams "Bill" Wagner (Guillermo Wagner) (born 25 October 1934) was a Mexican basketball player, farmer, international businessman and pilot. An alumnus of the University of Arizona, where he played basketball and football, he competed in the men's basketball tournament at the 1960 Summer Rome Olympics representing Mexico.

References

1934 births
Living people
Mexican men's basketball players
Olympic basketball players of Mexico
Basketball players at the 1960 Summer Olympics
Basketball players from Chihuahua